Song Kyung-sub (born 25 February 1971) is a South Korean retired footballer and football coach.

Club career

Manager career 
On 12 August 2018, He was sacked from Gangwon FC

References

External links 

1971 births
Living people
Association football midfielders
South Korean footballers
South Korean football managers
Suwon Samsung Bluewings players
K League 1 players
Jeonnam Dragons managers
Gangwon FC managers
FC Seoul non-playing staff